Emina Ekic (born June 6, 1999) is an American professional soccer player who plays as a forward for Racing Louisville FC of the National Women's Soccer League (NWSL). She previously played college soccer for the Louisville Cardinals.

Early life 
Ekic attended DuPont Manual High School, where she was named the 2015–16 Kentucky Gatorade Player of the Year. Ekic also played for Javanon SC.

Louisville Cardinals 
As a freshman in 2017, Ekic played in all 18 games for Louisville, starting 17 of them, and scored a team-high seven goals.  She was named ACC Co-Freshman of the Year, as well as being selected to the All-ACC second team and ACC All-Freshman team.

In 2018, Ekic started all 18 games for the Cardinals, and earned first team All-ACC team honors.

In her junior season, Ekic started all 20 games.  She scored 8 goals, including a game-winner vs. Vanderbilt on September 15.

In the 2020 fall season, Ekic started all nine games of the shortened ACC season.  Ekic scored seven goals and was named ACC Offensive Player of the Year.

Club career 
Ekic declared for the 2021 NWSL Draft on December 17, 2020. She was drafted fifth overall by expansion team Racing Louisville FC from her hometown.

She made her debut for Racing Louisville in their first match of the 2021 NWSL Challenge Cup. She scored Racing's first NWSL regular-season goal with a left-footed shot into the upper corner of the goal in a 2-0 win over the Washington Spirit, the club's first victory. Ekic finished her rookie season with 15 appearances, including three starts.

In November 2022, Ekic was loaned to Australian club Melbourne City until mid-February.

References 

1999 births
Living people
American women's soccer players
Louisville Cardinals women's soccer players
Racing Louisville FC draft picks
Racing Louisville FC players
Melbourne City FC (A-League Women) players
Women's association football forwards
National Women's Soccer League players